Vladimir Andreyevich Tarasenko (born 13 December 1991) is a Russian professional ice hockey right winger for the New York Rangers of the National Hockey League (NHL). Prior to playing in the NHL, he played in the system of Sibir Novosibirsk organization, first playing for the senior team in the Kontinental Hockey League (KHL) in 2008–09. He spent a total of three seasons with Novosibirsk before being traded to SKA Saint Petersburg in 2012. Tarasenko was selected in the first round, 16th overall, in the 2010 NHL Entry Draft by the St. Louis Blues, joining the team for the 2012–13 season. He spent parts of 11 seasons in St. Louis, becoming one of the franchise's leading scorers, playing in three NHL All-Star Games, and winning the Stanley Cup in 2019. Tarasenko was then traded to the New York Rangers in February 2023.

Playing career

Russia
Tarasenko made his professional debut with Sibir Novosibirsk in 2008–09, scoring seven goals and ten points in 38 games and was the runner up in voting for Rookie of the Year in the KHL's inaugural season. He was released to play with the Russian junior team at the 2009 IIHF World U18 Championships, where he scored eight goals in seven games and was named a tournament all-star as Russia won silver. Tarasenko returned to Sibir in 2009–10 as the seventh-youngest player in the League. He again represented Russia at the 2010 World Junior Ice Hockey Championships, finishing third in team scoring with five points in six games.

International Scouting Services (ISS) ranked Tarasenko as the top-ranked European skater, and fourth overall, in its mid-term rankings ahead of the 2010 NHL Entry Draft. Described by scouts as strong and mobile with no glaring weaknesses, Tarasenko had expressed interest in playing in the NHL, though his father, also his coach with Sibir, believed it was important that his son remain in Russia. Tarasenko was ultimately drafted by St. Louis Blues in the first round, 16th overall, at the 2010 Draft with the pick obtained via a trade from the Ottawa Senators St. Louis had acquired in exchange for David Rundblad.

On 13 January 2012, Tarasenko was traded to SKA Saint Petersburg in exchange for Vyacheslav Solodukhin. On 2 June 2012, Tarasenko announced that he would be moving to North America to play in the NHL for the St. Louis Blues rather than staying and playing in the KHL. As a result of the 2012–13 NHL lockout that cancelled a large part of the NHL regular season, however, Tarasenko instead returned to SKA to begin 2012–13. He credited the decision in part to a desire to play with Ilya Kovalchuk, the captain of the team who also joined as a result of the lockout.

St. Louis Blues
Once the lockout ended, Tarasenko began the shortened, 48-game 2012–13 season with the Blues. He scored his first and second career NHL goals on the first two shots of his league debut on 19 January 2013, against Jimmy Howard of the Detroit Red Wings in a 6–0 blowout. On 4 February, Tarasenko was named the NHL's Rookie of the Month for January after scoring five goals and four assists (nine points). He ultimately finished his first NHL season with eight goals and 11 assists in 38 games.

On 19 March 2014, towards the conclusion of the 2013–14 season, Tarasenko underwent successful surgery to repair a hand injury sustained in a 4–1 Blues win over the Nashville Predators. He was expected to miss the remainder of the regular season, but made a quick recovery, returning to play in the 2014 Stanley Cup playoffs where he scored four goals in the series against the Chicago Blackhawks.

On 28 October 2014, during the 2014–15 season, Tarasenko recorded his first career NHL hat-trick against Kari Lehtonen of the Dallas Stars and was later named the NHL's First Star of the Week after scoring five goals and one assist during the week. Tarasenko finished the regular season leading the Blues in both goals (37) and points (73), also finishing fifth in the league in goals and ninth in total points. On 18 April 2015, Tarasenko scored his first career Stanley Cup playoff hat-trick against Devan Dubnyk of the Minnesota Wild in Game 2 of St. Louis' Western Conference Quarterfinals matchup. In the series, he scored six goals and one assist (seven points), though the Blues ultimately fell to the Wild in six games. On 7 July 2015, during the subsequent off-season, Tarasenko, as a restricted free agent, signed an eight-year, $60 million contract with St. Louis at an annual average value of $7.5 million. Tarasenko is known for his very accurate and unique wrist shot, which has earned him a reputation as one of the most dangerous goal scorers in the NHL. He was one of only two players to score at least 30 goals in a five-season stretch from 2014-15 through 2018–19, along with fellow-Russian Alexander Ovechkin of the Washington Capitals.

Tarasenko won the Stanley Cup with the Blues in 2019, St. Louis' first Stanley Cup in their 52-year franchise history. During the Blues' 2019 playoff run, Tarasenko recorded 11 goals, the second-highest total among Blues players and the third-highest among all players in the playoffs. In game 5 of the 2019 Western Conference Final against the San Jose Sharks, Tarasenko became the first player in Blues playoff history to score a goal on a penalty shot.

On 24 October 2019, during a 5–2 win over the Los Angeles Kings, Tarasenko was forced to leave the game after getting tangled up with Kings defenceman Sean Walker. Four days later, it was announced that Tarasenko would require shoulder surgery and be sidelined at least five months. This was the second of three shoulder surgeries Tarasenko would undergo in a span of less than three years due to lingering instability, the first after an April 2018 injury and the third following an early departure from the team in the 2019-2020 postseason. 

On 7 July 2021, it was reported that Tarasenko had requested a trade from St. Louis due to him being unhappy with how the club had handled his shoulder surgeries. He was left unprotected in the 2021 NHL Expansion Draft, but was not selected.

Despite tensions between the Blues and Tarasenko, a trade could not be made to honor his request to be moved. The two sides ultimately put the situation behind them and Tarasenko remained with St. Louis for the 2021–22 season. Tarasenko went on to have the most productive year of his career to that point, scoring 34 goals and setting career highs in assists (48) and points (82), averaging more than a point per game. He helped the Blues advance to the second round of the 2022 NHL playoffs, tallying nine points and six goals in 12 playoff games, including his second career playoff hat trick in Game 5 of the Blues' first round series against the Minnesota Wild. During the playoffs, he also scored his 40th career postseason goal, becoming the second player in franchise history besides Brett Hull to reach that mark.

New York Rangers
Tarasenko, alongside defenceman Niko Mikkola, was traded to the New York Rangers on 9 February 2023. In his Rangers debut a day later against the Seattle Kraken, Tarasenko scored his first goal with his new team in only 2:49 in the first period, which was the fourth fastest goal in Rangers debut in franchise history, behind Norman Lowe (1:00 in 1950), Lane Lambert (2:28 in 1986), and Mike Allison (2:44 in 1980).

International play

Internationally, Tarasenko has played for the Russian junior team three times, winning a silver medal at the 2009 IIHF World U18 Championships, sixth place at the 2010 World Junior Ice Hockey Championships and captained Russia to a gold medal at the 2011 World Junior Ice Hockey Championships. At the senior level, Tarasenko has also played for Russia at the 2011 IIHF World Championship and was a member of the Russian national team for the 2014 Winter Olympics held in his native Russia, in Sochi. He represented Russia at the 2015 IIHF World Championship, winning a silver medal, the 2016 World Cup of Hockey, and 2021 IIHF World Championship.

Personal life
Tarasenko's father, Andrei, is a former Russian league scoring champion and Olympian who competed at the 1994 Winter Olympics.

Tarasenko married his wife, Yana, on 1 July 2015. The couple have three sons born in 2007, 2016 and 2019. The son born in 2007 is his stepson. During the season, the family resided in Creve Coeur, Missouri, before selling the home in 2020 and moving into St. Louis.

Tarasenko was the cover athlete for EA Sports' NHL 17.

Career statistics

Regular season and playoffs

International

Awards and honors

References

External links

 

1991 births
HC Sibir Novosibirsk players
Ice hockey players at the 2014 Winter Olympics
Living people
National Hockey League All-Stars
National Hockey League first-round draft picks
New York Rangers players
Olympic ice hockey players of Russia
Russian expatriate ice hockey people
Russian expatriate sportspeople in the United States
Russian ice hockey right wingers
Russian people of Ukrainian descent
Sibirskie Snaipery players
SKA Saint Petersburg players
Sportspeople from Yaroslavl
St. Louis Blues draft picks
St. Louis Blues players
Stanley Cup champions